West Germanic gemination was a sound change that took place in all West Germanic languages around the 3rd or 4th century AD. Because of Sievers' law, only consonants immediately after a short vowel were affected by the process.

Overview
The consonant , whether original or from earlier  through rhotacization, was generally not affected; it occasionally shows gemination in Old High German, but inconsistently and this may be an analogical change. In contrast, the second element of the diphthongs iu and au was still underlyingly the consonant  at this time, and therefore was lengthened as well.

In Proto-Germanic,  only appeared at the beginning of a syllable, primarily as the onset of a variety of suffixes and endings. It alternated with its syllabic counterpart  in accordance with a phonological rule known as Sievers' law. This law states that consonantal  appeared after a "light" syllable: one that contained a short vowel followed by at most one consonant. The syllabic allomorph  appeared after "heavy" syllables, which included syllables containing a long vowel, a diphthong, or ending in more than one consonant. Compare, for example, the Germanic verbs *fūlijaną "to defile" and *fuljaną "to fill, to make full", which appear in Old English as fȳlan and fyllan respectively, and in Old High German as fūlen and fullen; the first verb shows no gemination, while the second does.

In the early history of most individual Germanic languages, syllabic  was generally lost, while consonantal  was retained. Earlier consonantal  is also lost, however, after a consonant that underwent gemination. Thus,  remains only after  (Old English werian < Proto-Germanic *warjaną), while  appears in all other cases, even those where Proto-Germanic had  (such as *fuljaną above). It therefore appears that Sievers' law was still productive at this stage, and adapted to the new syllable length by changing the suffix from its consonantal to its syllabic variety.

Gemination triggered by /l/, /r/
West Germanic gemination also operated inconsistently on consonants followed by /l/ or /r/, e.g. Old English æppel "apple" < Proto-Germanic *aplaz. In some cases this led to doublets, e.g. West Saxon Old English tēar "tear (of the eyes)" < *tæher < Proto-Germanic *tahraz (without gemination) vs. Northumbrian Old English tæhher "tear (of the eyes)" (with gemination).

Parallel changes in Old Norse

Similar changes occurred in the history of Old Norse, although with a more limited scope. Other consonants were not affected. Contrary to the changes in West Germanic, the  remained nonsyllabic after the change, and was therefore retained rather than lost like syllabic  was in other Old Norse words.

Effects

This change particularly affected the infinitives of the first conjugation of weak verbs, which ended in *-(i)janą. It also affect the short-stemmed ja(n)- and jō(n)-stem nouns and adjectives. By historical times (c. 800-900 AD), all of the West Germanic languages except Old Saxon had lost medial syllabic , but not before any  that it may have developed from had triggered i-Mutation.

Examples:

West Germanic languages
Germanic language histories
History of the German language
History of the Dutch language
History of the English language
Sound changes